Maungahaumi is a mountain in the Raukumara Range in the northeast of New Zealand's North Island.

Part of the backbone of the range, which forms part of a line of mountains extending across much of the North Island, 1213 metre (3979 ft) Maungahaumi is the southernmost of the Raukumara Range's most prominent peaks. To the southwest of the peak is a saddle separating the Raukumara Range from the Huiarau Range – this saddle, with its highest point at the 725 metre Traffords Hill, is crossed by State Highway 2, the main road link between Gisborne and Opotiki in the Bay of Plenty.

Several rivers have their sources on the slopes of Maungahaumi, including the Motu River and several tributaries of the Waipaoa River.

Cultural significance 
Maungahaumi is the principal ancestral mountain of the Maori tribe Ngaariki Kaiputahi, as well as other affiliated tribal groups and hapū in the Tūranga region.

Name 
The origins of the name date back to the story of the Horouta waka and its journey from Hawaiki. The Horouta waka (led by captain Paoa) became severely damaged by high winds and seas en route to New Zealand. The waka and the crew on board were subsequently washed ashore at Ohiwa near Opotiki with a broken hull and bow piece. Upon landing, Paoa and his crew ventured inland to the interior mountain ranges to find suitable materials to repair the vessel. It was on the mountain that we now know as Maungahaumi, where he found the totara trees that were used to repair and bring together the hull and bow pieces of the waka.

The tale is also told in the old  (chant) "Haramai a Paoa".

References

Mau